NGC 6027a is a spiral galaxy that is part of Seyfert's Sextet, a compact group of galaxies, which is located in the constellation Serpens. In optical wavelengths, it has a strong resemblance to Messier 104, the Sombrero Galaxy, with which it shares a near equivalent orientation to observers on Earth.

See also
 NGC 6027
 NGC 6027b
 NGC 6027c
 NGC 6027d
 NGC 6027e
 Seyfert's Sextet

References

External links
 HubbleSite NewsCenter: Pictures and description

Spiral galaxies
6027A
56576
10116 NED02
Serpens (constellation)
Peculiar galaxies